Rosario Di Vincenzo (born June 16, 1941 in Genoa) is a retired Italian professional football player.

Honours
 Serie A champion: 1964/65.
 European Cup winner: 1964/65.
 Coppa delle Alpi winner: 1971.

1941 births
Living people
Italian footballers
Serie A players
Serie B players
U.S. Triestina Calcio 1918 players
Inter Milan players
S.S.D. Varese Calcio players
Genoa C.F.C. players
S.S. Lazio players
U.C. Sampdoria players
Potenza S.C. players
Association football goalkeepers
U.S. Imperia 1923 players